G. aurantiaca may refer to:

Gemmatimonas aurantiaca, a bacterium
Guarianthe aurantiaca, an orchid species